Dmitri Andreyevich Ogurtsov (born 20 June 1994) is a Russian professional ice hockey defenceman. He is currently an unrestricted free agent who most recently played with Traktor Chelyabinsk of the Kontinental Hockey League (KHL).

Ogurtsov made his Kontinental Hockey League debut playing with HC CSKA Moscow during the 2013–14 KHL season.

On 14 July 2020, Ogurtsov continued his KHL career, signing a one-year contract as a free agent with his fifth club, Traktor Chelyabinsk.

References

External links

1994 births
Living people
HC CSK VVS Samara players
HC CSKA Moscow players
HC Dynamo Moscow players
Krasnaya Armiya (MHL) players
HC Kuban players
HC Lada Togliatti players
HC Neftekhimik Nizhnekamsk players
Russian ice hockey defencemen
Ice hockey people from Moscow
Traktor Chelyabinsk players